Secret Ambition is a Japanese-language song, and the 15th single from Japanese singer Nana Mizuki. Secret Ambition saw a massive change in Nana Mizuki's music style, dramatically changing from pop and powerpop to an explosive rock sound.

Secret Ambition was the first opening theme for the anime Magical Girl Lyrical Nanoha StrikerS and the B-side, "Heart-Shaped Chant" was the theme song for PS2 game Shining Wind). It is currently her second best-selling single.

Music video

The music video of "Secret Ambition" starts off with a scene showing what a white room with a floor covered in looks like a white tea set of china ware. The video features two Nana egos - a "dark" one, and an "innocent" one. The dark one is singing on a stage in dark-coloured clothes, with a dark background and a backing band consisting of guitar and drum players who are also dressed in black or dark colours. The "innocent" one sits crouched in the white room with the cups, in white clothes.

Track listing
SECRET AMBITION
Lyrics: Nana Mizuki
Composition: Chiyomaru Shikura
Arrangement: Hitoshi Fujima (Elements Garden)
First opening theme for anime television series Magical Girl Lyrical Nanoha Strikers
Heart-shaped chant
Lyrics: Nana Mizuki
Composition, arrangement: Noriyasu Agematsu (Elements Garden)
Theme song for PS2 game Shining Wind
Level Hi!
Lyrics: Chisato Nishimura
Composition, arrangement: Shinya Saitou
Ending theme for TBS TV series 
SECRET AMBITION (without NANA)
Heart-Shaped Chant (without NANA)
Level Hi! (without NANA)

Charts

References

Nana Mizuki songs
Songs written by Nana Mizuki
2007 singles
2007 songs
King Records (Japan) singles